Lera is a village in the municipality of Bitola, North Macedonia. It used to be part of the former municipality of Capari.

Demographics
The Albanian population of Lera are Tosks, a subgroup of southern Albanians.

According to the 2002 census, the village had a total of 122 inhabitants. Ethnic groups in the village include:

Albanians 85 
Macedonians 36
Others 3

References

External links
 Visit Macedonia

Villages in Bitola Municipality
Albanian communities in North Macedonia